Terra Nova School is a prep school in Cheshire, England for children from two and a half to thirteen years of age. It began as a school for boys in 1897, and today educates boys and girls.

Children aged two and a half to seven attend the pre-prep school, and pupils aged eight to thirteen attend the prep school. A charitable trust since 1955, the life and work of the school are overseen by a distinguished governing body.

Since 1939 the school has occupied a site of just over  including extensive playing fields, in a rural area within the bounds of Holmes Chapel. At the core of the site is Jodrell Hall, a country house begun in 1779 with additions in 1835.

Notable pupils 
Will Carling, former Captain of the England Rugby team
Ben Ainslie, the most successful sailor in Olympic history
Hamish Watson, Scottish Rugby international
J. G. Farrell, Booker Prize winning writer
Robert Bruce-Gardner, 10 June 1943 - 6 September 2017, Conservator of paintings at the Courtauld Institute

See also
Listed buildings in Twemlow

References

External links 

Profile on the ISC website

Private schools in the Borough of Cheshire East
Educational institutions established in 1897
Preparatory schools in Cheshire
Boarding schools in Cheshire
1897 establishments in England